The Punjab Legislative Council was the legislature of the province of Punjab in British India. Established by British authorities under Government of India Act 1919, the council had nominal powers and a membership of mainly pro-British politicians and government officials. Voting was largely boycotted until the Government of India Act 1935 increased representation and the powers of the assembly.

The First World War gave the momentum to the growing demand for self-government in British India. Therefore, the new constitutional reforms, under the Montagu–Chelmsford Reforms were introduced by British Government. The scheme was implemented through the Government of India Act 1919. The first Council was constituted on 8 January 1921 for the first time. The election for first Council was held in December 1920. 71 members were elected and 22 were nominated by Governor and the last election held in 1930 and the council disbanded in 1936

Presidents
Color key for the Party of President
 
 
List of Presidents

Deputy President

First Council

The first Punjab Legislative Council was formed in 1921 for a three-year term. The Council had 93 members, seventy per cent of whom were elected and rest nominated.

An elected president presided over meetings of the Council. The first Punjab Legislative Council held 98 meetings between 8 January 1921 and 27 October 1923.

Notable members included:

Sir Montagu Butler (President)
Herbert Alexander Casson (President)
Manohar Lal (Lahore — Punjab University)
Sir Fazl-i-Husain (Elected — Muhammadan Landholders)
Sikandar Hayat Khan (Punjabi politician) (Wah, Attock — Muhammadan, Rural)
Sundar Singh Majithia (Ex-officio member, Member Executive Council)
Feroz Khan Noon (Shahpur West — (Muhammadan), Rural)
Chhotu Ram (South East Rohtak (Non-Muhammadan)
Mian Muhammad Shahnawaz (Lahore, Lahore — Muhammadan, Rural)

Second Council

The second Legislative Council was constituted on 2 January 1924 and held 102 meetings until it was dissolved on 27 October 1926.

Sir Sheikh Abdul Qadir was the first elected and the first Muslim President of this Council. He resigned in September 1925 when he was appointed Minister for Education, and was succeeded by Sir Shahab-ud-Din Virk.

Notable members included:

Sir George Anderson (Director of Public Instruction, Punjab)
Herbert Alexander Casson (President)
Sir Shahab-ud-Din Virk (President)
Sir Sheikh Abdul Qadir (President)
Manohar Lal (Lahore — Punjab University)
Sir Fazl-i-Husain (Minister for Education, Revenue Member — Muhammadan Landholders)
Sikandar Hayat Khan (Attock — Muhammadan, Rural)
Sundar Singh Majithia (Revenue Member)
John Maynard (Leader of the House, Finance Member)
Jogendra Singh (Sikh Landholders, Minister for Agriculture)
Chhotu Ram (South East Rohtak — Non-Muhammadan, Rural, Minister for Agriculture, Education)

Third Council

The third Legislative Council sat between 3 January 1927 and 26 July 1930, during which is held 111 meetings. Sir Shahab-ud-Din Virk was re-elected President on 4 January 1927.

Notable members included:

Sir George Anderson (Director of Public Instruction, Punjab)
Sir Sheikh Abdul Qadir (Representative, General Interests)
Sir Henry Craik (Finance Member Government of Punjab)
Sir Geoffrey Fitzhervey de Montmorency (Finance Member to Government, Punjab)
Herbert Emerson (Secretary to Government Punjab, Finance Department)
Sir Fazl-i-Husain Revenue Member to Government Punjab
Sir Muhammad Iqbal (Lahore City — Muhammadan, Urban)
Sikandar Hayat Khan (Muhammadan — Landholders)
Manohar Lal (Punjab University) — Minister for Education
Feroz Khan Noon (Shahpur East — Muhammadan, Rural) — Minister for Local Self-Government
Chhotu Ram (Hissar — Non-Muhammadan, Rural)
Sir Jogendra Singh (Sikh Landholders) — Minister for Agriculture
Sir Shahab-ud-Din Virk (President)

Fourth Council

The fourth and the last Legislative Council was constituted on 25 October 1930 and held 197 meetings until it was dissolved on 17 November 1935. Sir Shahab-ud-Din Virk was reelected unopposed as President for a third term. He resigned when he was appointmed Minister for Education and was succeeded by Sir Chhotu Ram.

Notable members included:
Sir George Anderson (Director of Public Instruction, Punjab)
Mazhar Ali Azhar (East and West Central Towns — Muhammadan, Urban)
Sir Henry Craik (Finance Member to Government, Punjab)
Mushtaq Ahmed Gurmani  (Representative of  General Interest)
Sir Fazl-i-Husain Minister for Education
Miles Irving (Finance Member, Minister Revenue previously worked as Financial Commissioner)
Sikandar Hayat Khan (Revenue Member to Government, Punjab)
Manohar Lal (Punjab University)
Shahnawaz Khan Mamdot (Representative of General Interest)
Feroz Khan Noon (Shahpur East — Muhammadan, Rural) — Minister for Education
Chhotu Ram (President)
Sir Jogendra Singh (Sikh, Landholders — Minister for Agriculture)
Arjan Singh(Sikh, MLC Hoshiarpur and Kangra 1936)
Sir Shahab-ud-Din Virk (President)

See also
1920 Punjab Legislative Council election
1923 Punjab Legislative Council election
1926 Punjab Legislative Council election
1930 Punjab Legislative Council election

References

Provinces of British India
History of Punjab
Defunct lower houses
Legislatures of British India